Leo Dickinson is a British cameraman, director and adventurer. He has made 68 films, winning every major mountain and adventure film award. Dickinson specialises in mountain, ballooning, skydiving and underwater films. During his mountaineering career, Dickinson has filmed climbs on a number of mountains including Mount Everest, Cima Grande di Laveredo, Civetta, Piz Badille, Matterhorn North Face, Eiger North Face, Cerro Torre, Torre Egger, and in 1991 filmed the first ever hot air balloon ascent over Everest. Dickinson has authored three books detailing stories of his career: Filming the Impossible, Anything is Possible and Ballooning over Everest. Dickinson is renowned for his use of unique camera angles and holds several world records, including as skydiving into the world's highest platform (on Everest). Dickinson is a keen skydiver, with over 3500 skydives completed, and holds numerous records, including skydiving with the largest single number of naked women at one time.

Personal life 
Dickinson was born in 1946 in Lancashire, United Kingdom. He attended Rossall Public School, during which time he started rock climbing in the Lake District and North Wales. He spent his first Alpine season in the Dolomites in 1966 and in 1970 secured the backing for his first film with Yorkshire TV resulting in an award-winning film Out of the Shadows into the Sun - The first filmed ascent of the Eiger.

Dickinson is married to Mandy, an award-winning camerawoman and fellow adventurer. Mandy has helped on Leo's films since 1981, and in 1989 became British Skydiving Champion and is now a commercial balloon pilot working for Virgin.

Awards

References

External links
 

British filmmakers
British mountain climbers
1947 births
Living people